"The Armenian and the Armenian" is a short story written by William Saroyan in August 1935 in New York. It was first published in 1936 in the collection of short stories entitled Inhale & Exhale. Over the years, the story has become known for the excerpt—"arguably [Saroyan's] most famous saying"—about the survival of the Armenian people after the genocide of 1915.

Background
William Saroyan was born in Fresno, California, to Armenian immigrant parents from Turkish (Western) Armenia. The Armenian community in Fresno—already significant by the 1910s—grew larger by the influx of genocide survivors and Saroyan grew up in an Armenian environment. In his 1935 story "First Visit to Armenia", Saroyan wrote that he "began to visit Armenia as soon as I had earned the necessary money."

Overview
In the story, Saroyan tells about his encounter with an Armenian waiter he accidentally meets at a beer parlor in the Russian city of Rostov in 1935, en route to Soviet Armenia. The two Armenians, although from different parts of the world, speak Armenian with each other. This fact inspired him to write the story. In a personal note for the second edition (1943) of Inhale & Exhale, Saroyan calls "The Armenian and the Armenian" his favorite of the 31 selected stories.

The excerpt
"The Armenian and the Armenian" is best known for its last two paragraphs, in which Saroyan "unleashes emotional energy and praises the Armenians' ability to survive as a nation". The original text reads as follows:

Misquotation
The quote is often modified; commonly, the phrase "see if they will not create a New Armenia" is added at the end. It remains unclear under what circumstances it was added. In 2020 the William Saroyan House Museum noted that Saroyan never said those words and the misquotation originated from a 1982 poster and asked to quote the "original, powerful Saroyanesque paragraph."

Significance and usage
Over the years, this excerpt has become of symbolic significance in the Armenian diaspora, which was formed, primarily, as a result of the genocide. Various authors, including English travel writer Philip Marsden, Israeli writer Yoram Kaniuk, American playwright David Mamet, Iranian-born Armenian-American academic Vartan Gregorian, French military writer Gérard Chaliand, Armenian-American criminal defense lawyer Mark Geragos, Armenian-American journalist Stephen Kurkjian, and others have quoted it in their works.

In 2008, California state senators Dave Cogdill and Joe Simitian, along with California assemblymen Greg Aghazarian, Juan Arambula, Paul Krekorian, and Michael Villines proposed a bill which "would designate the year 2008 as the William Saroyan Year". In the statement, "The Armenian and the Armenian" was described as "an especially stirring declaration of solidarity... The words evoke notes of grief, rage, resilience, and rebirth, in relation to Armenian cultural and social life."

In film
The story was adapted into a short film by Armen Karaoghlanian in 2010.

The quote appeared at the end of the 2016 film The Promise, a film about the Armenian Genocide.

See also
Armenian genocide in culture

References

External links
"The Armenian and the Armenian" from the original 1936 publication
Saroyan reading the famous excerpt from the story on YouTube

1935 short stories
Works about the Armenian genocide